Quimby may refer to:

 Harriet Quimby, the first woman to gain a pilot's license in the United States
Quimby (surname), a list of people and fictional characters
 Quimby, Iowa, a small city in the United States
 Quimby (band), a Hungarian alternative rock band
 Quimby the Mouse, a comic strip and character created by Chris Ware
 Quimby Pipe Organs, an American company founded 1970
 Quimby College, former name of Southwestern College (Santa Fe, New Mexico), also Quimby Metaphysical Library and Quimby Memorial Library

See also
Quimby House (disambiguation)